Kauai schiedea is a common name for several plants and may refer to:

Schiedea apokremnos
Schiedea kauaiensis